Serr is a surname. Notable people with this surname include:

 Jan Serr (born 1943), American visual artist
 Jeff Serr (born 1955), American radio personality
 Michael Serr (born 1962), German football player

See also
 Ser (disambiguation)
 Sere (disambiguation)
 Serre (disambiguation)